Viktor Ivanovich Kukin (born 1 May 1960) is a Russian professional football official and a former player and referee. He works as an administrator with FC Metallurg Lipetsk.

Playing career
A graduate of the FC Metallurg Lipetsk youth football system, Kukin played professional football in the Soviet Top League with FC Krylia Sovetov Kuybyshev and FC Kuban Krasnodar, and in the Soviet First League and Soviet Second League with FC Novolipetsk Lipetsk and FC Metallurg Lipetsk.

Referee career
From 1993 to 2001 he worked as a referee in the Russian First Division and lower levels.

References

External links
 

1960 births
Sportspeople from Lipetsk
Living people
Soviet footballers
Association football defenders
FC Metallurg Lipetsk players
PFC Krylia Sovetov Samara players
FC Kuban Krasnodar players
FC Iskra Smolensk players
FC Elista players
Soviet Top League players
Russian football referees